Green Mountain High School is a public high school in the western part of the city of Lakewood in Jefferson County, Colorado, United States. It is administered by Jefferson County Public Schools.

Athletics  
Green Mountain High School offers the following athletic programs:
 Fall Programs
 Cross Country
 Football
 Gymnastics
 Golf (Boys')
 Soccer (Boys')
 Softball
 Tennis (Boys')
 Volleyball
 Cheer
 Winter Programs
 Basketball
 Swim and Dive (Boys')
 Spring Programs
 Baseball
 Golf (Girl's)
 Lacrosse
 Soccer (Girl's)
 Swim and Dive (Boys')
 Tennis (Girl's)
 Track and Field

History 
Green Mountain High School opened in 1973 and graduated its first class of students in 1975. There were no seniors the first year it operated as the school system felt it would be unfair to transfer students from Bear Creek High School to a new school for their senior year.

The Second Wind Fund, a suicide prevention program, was founded in response to the suicide cluster involving four Green Mountain High School students.

Notable alumni

Michelle Beisner-Buck, NFL reporter, host
Derek Cianfrance, Film director, cinematographer, screenwriter, and editor
Nicole Hensley, Professional Ice Hockey Player, US Women's National Team Member
Paul Ray Ramsey, vlogger, YouTube personality and public speaker

References

External links
 

Public high schools in Colorado
Jefferson County Public Schools (Colorado)
Education in Lakewood, Colorado
Schools in Jefferson County, Colorado